Nasser bin Ghanim Al-Khelaifi (born 12 November 1973) is a Qatari businessman and the chairman of beIN Media Group, chairman of Qatar Sports Investments, president of Paris Saint-Germain and the Qatar Tennis Federation, and vice president of the Asian Tennis Federation for West Asia.

Al-Khelaifi is the president and chief executive officer of Paris Saint-Germain in France. He is also a member of the organizing committee for the FIFA Club World Cup, and has been elected as the chairman of the European Club Association (ECA).

Early life and education
Al-Khelaifi was born in Qatar, a son of a pearl fisherman, and graduated with an Economics Degree from Qatar University. He also has a post graduate degree in Maritime Studies from University of Piraeus.

Tennis career

Playing career 

As a tennis professional, Al-Khelaifi was the second most successful member of the Qatar Davis Cup team after Sultan Khalfan, playing 43 times between 1992 and 2002 and compiling a 12–31 record in singles, 12–16 in doubles. Al-Khelaifi appeared twice on the Association of Tennis Professionals (ATP) main tour, losing each time in his first round matches in St. Pölten in 1996 (where he lost to former French Open Champion Thomas Muster) and in Doha in 2002. He reached a career-high singles ranking of No. 995 in late 2002. He also won the GCC Team Tournament.

Post-playing career 
Nasser Al-Khelaifi has been president of the Qatar Tennis Federation (QTF) since November 2008. In 2011, he was elected vice-president of the Asian Tennis Federation (ATF) for West Asia.

Business career

Qatar Sports Investments
Nasser Al-Khelaifi has been chairman of Qatar Sports Investments (QSi) from June 2011. QSi is a sovereign wealth fund dedicated to investments in the sport and leisure industry on a national and international level.

Following the QSi acquisition of Paris Saint-Germain (PSG) football club in June 2011, Nasser Al-Khelaifi became the chairman of the board of PSG and also CEO of the club, reinforcing Qatari interest in French football.

QSi has several other high-profile partnerships. QSi also owns the Burrda sportswear brand.

Paris Saint-Germain
Nasser Al-Khelaifi became the new president and chief executive officer of Paris Saint-Germain on 7 October 2011. Shortly after being named president, he presented a five-year plan to take Paris Saint-Germain to the top of the tree in France and abroad. As part of the long-term plan for the club, Al-Khelaifi brought in former footballer Leonardo as the new director of football.

Although Al-Khelaifi initially demanded a major trophy haul for the 2011–12 season, PSG were soon eliminated from the UEFA Europa League and both domestic cups, leaving the team only able to spend $130 million on players. PSG failed to dominate, and lost out to eventual winners Montpellier, though they qualified for the UEFA Champions League by finishing second.

In the 2012–13 season, PSG won the Ligue 1 title and also made it to the quarter-finals of the UEFA Champions League, thanks partly to the goalscoring of newly signed striker, Zlatan Ibrahimović. They eventually lost in a two-legged tie to FC Barcelona on away goals.

In the 2013–14 season, PSG again finished top of Ligue 1 with a record total of 89 points. They reached the quarter-finals of the UEFA Champions League where they lost to Chelsea 3–3 on aggregate, again going out only on the away goals rule.

In the 2018–19 UEFA Champions League knockout phase, they lost to Manchester United at home after leading with two goals at Old Trafford in the first leg. PSG lost at home 1–3 (3–3 on aggregate) and were knocked out by the away-goal rule.

In June 2012, QSi acquired the Paris Handball Club and merged it with the PSG sport franchise to create a wider and more competitive sport offer to the city of Paris. Since 2012, Paris Saint-Germain Handball has won the LNH Division 1 five times, while reaching the EHF Champions League final in 2016–17 and the semi-finals in 2015–16 and 2017–18.

beIN Media Group
On 31 December 2013, Al Jazeera Sport's global operations were spun out of Al Jazeera Media Network (AJMN) and rebranded as beIN Sports. A few months later, beIN Media Group was incorporated and became the official owner of beIN Sports branded networks as well as all other non-news and current affairs assets originally belonging to AJMN. beIN Sports has 22 channels, including 17 HD channels, and broadcasts across the Middle East, North Africa, Europe, North America, Australia, and Asia. The strategy, aside from building the beIN premium sports network, is to develop the group's ambitions in sports and entertainment in production, distribution, and digital media sectors.

In October 2017, the Swiss courts opened an investigation against him for suspicion of private corruption in the allocation of television rights for the World Cups 2026 and 2030 for the Middle East and North Africa international media market. On 30 October 2020, Nasser Al-Khelaifi was cleared of the case over the awarding of television rights for the World Cup. Al-Khelaifi had been accused of aggravated criminal mismanagement for his alleged part in a corruption trial involving former FIFA general secretary Jerome Valcke. However, Valcke was found guilty of forging documents related to television rights for the World Cup and was fined 24,000 Swiss francs ($26,500). According to the Swiss attorney general’s office, alleged that Valcke exploited his FIFA role between 2013 and 2015 to favour media partners that he preferred by providing the media rights for various World Cup and Confederations Cup tournaments.

Political career 
In November 2013, Al-Khelaifi was made minister without portfolio in the Qatari government by the emir of Qatar, Sheikh Tamim.

Legal proceedings
On 9 March 2022, after Paris Saint-Germain's 1–3 away loss (2–3 aggregate score) to Real Madrid in the 2021–22 UEFA Champions League round of 16, Al-Khelaifi allegedly assaulted a linesman and broke his flag and threatened a Madrid employee with murder. Following investigation, UEFA cleared Al-Khelaifi of all charges related to the match.

Awards and honors
In February 2012, he won a French 'Sport Business' award, receiving the most votes out of 1,500 and finishing ahead of nine people.

His growing influence in the sport was recognised in 2015 when he was voted 'favourite Ligue 1 president' in a poll conducted by France Football, with 35% of the votes cast. 

In 2016, the French daily sport newspaper L'Équipe named him the 'most powerful man in French football' in a 30-man list, ahead of such notable individuals as Didier Deschamps and Zinedine Zidane. 

In 2019, he was elected by the European Club Association as delegate at the UEFA executive committee, becoming the first Arab to hold an UEFA position.

In 2020, he was named the most influential person in football by France Football. 

In March 2020, Al-Khelaifi was praised by World Health Organization Director-General Tedros Adhanom Ghebreyesus after offering to help in the global fight against the COVID-19 pandemic by using his players and club to send health advice messages to the public.

Personal life
He is close to the Emir, Sheikh Tamim, head of sovereign wealth fund Qatar Investment Authority. 

He is married, and has four children who reside in Qatar.

References

1973 births
Living people
Qatari male tennis players
Tennis players at the 2002 Asian Games
Asian Games competitors for Qatar
Qatari businesspeople
Sports businesspeople
Al Jazeera people
Qatari business executives
Qatari football chairmen and investors
Chairmen and investors of football clubs in France
Qatari expatriates in France
French people of Qatari descent
Paris Saint-Germain F.C. presidents
Qatar University alumni
University of Piraeus alumni